is a masculine Japanese given name. Notable people with the name include:

Shinji Aoyama (真治), a Japanese film director
Shinji Aramaki (伸志), a Japanese anime director and mechanical designer
Shinji Hashimoto, a Japanese game producer
Shinji Harada, a Japanese pop music artist
Shinji Higuchi (真嗣), a Japanese storyboard artist
Shinji Hosoe (慎治), a Japanese composer
Shinji Hosokawa (伸二), a Japanese judoka
Shinji Inoue (信治), a Japanese politician
Shinji Ishihira, a Japanese director
Shinji Kagawa (真司), a Japanese football player
Shinji Kajio (真治), a Japanese author of science fiction and fantasy
Shinji Kawada (紳司), a Japanese voice actor
Shinji Kazama, a Japanese motorcyclist
, Japanese footballer and manager
Shinji Maejima (信次), a Japanese Orientalist
Shinji Maki (伸二), a Japanese comedian
Shinji Mikami (真司), a Japanese video game designer
Shinji Mizui, a Japanese musician
Shinji Mizushima (新司), a Japanese manga artist
Shinji Miyadai (真司), a Japanese sociologist
Shinji Miyazaki, a Japanese composer/arranger
Shinji Mori (慎二), a Japanese baseball pitcher
Shinji Morisue (慎二), a Japanese gymnast and tarento
Shinji Nakae (真司), a Japanese voice actor
Shinji Nakano (信治), a Japanese racing driver
, Japanese long jumper
Shinji Okazaki (慎司), a Japanese football player
Shinji Ono (伸二), a Japanese football player
Shinji Orito (伸治), a Japanese musical composer
, Japanese sailor
, Japanese baseball player
Shinji Sōmai (相米 慎二), a Japanese film director
Shinji Takahashi (disambiguation), multiple people
, Japanese baseball player
, Japanese religious leader
, Japanese sport shooter
, Japanese volleyball player
Shinji Takamatsu, anime director for Gin Tama
Shinji Takao (紳路), a Japanese professional Go player
Shinji Takeda (真治), a Japanese actor and saxophonist
Shinji Takehara (慎二), a Japanese professional boxer
Shinji Takahira (慎士), a Japanese sprinter
Shinji Tanimura (新司), a Japanese singer-songwriter
, Japanese footballer
Shinji Tsujio (真二), a Japanese football player
Shinji Turner-Yamamoto, a Japanese environmental artist
Shinji Udaka (伸次), a Japanese baseball player
Shinji Wada (慎二), a Japanese manga artist
, Japanese footballer
Shinji Yamamoto (disambiguation), multiple people
, Japanese water polo player

Fictional characters
Shinji Ikari, of Neon Genesis Evangelion
Shinji Itou, a supporting character in the visual novel and anime Chaos;Child
Shinji, from Texhnolyze
Shinji, an antagonist of the manga Digimon Chronicle, partnered with Omnimon X
Shinji, Japanese name of Paul from Pokémon
Shinji Hirako, from Bleach
Shinji Ibu, a regular for the Fudomine Middle School tennis team in the Prince of Tennis manga and anime
Shinji Kamuro, from Mob Psycho 100
Shinji Kido, the title hero from Kamen Rider Ryuki
Shinji Kasai, the Ultimate Firefighter, from Danganronpa Another 2: Moon of Hope and Sun of Despair
Shinji Kubo, the protagonist of the Yukio Mishima novel The Sound of Waves
Shinji Mimura, from Battle Royale
Shinji Matō, from Fate/Stay Night
Shinji Nakagawa in Megazone 23
Shinji Tanaka, from Yakuza
Shinji Webber, from Yu-Gi-Oh! Arc-V
Shinji Inui, from Initial D
Shinji Watari, from Haikyuu!!
Shinji Koganei, from Kuroko's Basketball
Shinji Nishiya, from My Hero Academia
Shinji, from Kids Return

See also

 
 

Japanese masculine given names